Suhitpangphaa reign (1780–1795), also Gaurinath Singha, was an Ahom king of the Ahom kingdom.  He lost his capital Rangpur to the Moamoria rebellion and camped in the Nagaon and Guwahati region till Captain Welsh removed the rebels.  Thereafter he established his capital at Jorhat, the Burhagohain's base during the rebellion. During his reign the Barkandazes and subsidiary kings devastated Lower Assam while Moamarias devastated Upper Assam.

Reign
The nobles placed Gaurinath Singh on the throne and he was installed with the usual ceremonies. He caused the other princes of the blood to be mutilated to disqualify them for succession. The Bar Barua was chosen by him as his Chief adviser and at his instigation the Bar Gohain and several of his near relatives were beheaded on the allegation that the Bar Gohain was against Gaurinath Singh’s accession. The Bar Barua himself offended the king by transacting affairs without consulting him and was dismissed and deprived of his possessions.

Burning of Capital
Gaurinath became the disciple of a son of Ramananda Acharya. A bitter enemy of the Moamarias, he lost no opportunity of oppressing them and goaded them into a fresh rebellion. One night in April, 1782 a band of Moamarias attached themselves to the king’s party, disguising themselves as torch-bearers, when the king was returning to Garhgaon after a fishing expedition and thus gaining admittance to the town, attacked and killed several of the king’s attendants. The king could escape to the palace on an elephant. The insurgents who wanted to set fire to the town were driven away by the Burha Gohain who arrived with soldiers in time?. The insurgents next marched to Rangpur, broke open the gates of the town, paraded the streets, killed whomsoever they met and set fire to houses and put local officers to flight. The Burha Gohain came and dispersed them. The energetic and capable Burha Gohain advised conciliatory methods for winning over the malcontents and had his advice been followed, the Moamarias perhaps would not have given further trouble. The new BarBarua advised whole-sale extermination of the Moamarias, which commended itself to the cruel and vindictive nature of the king.

Massacre of the insurgents
A general massacre of the Moamarias was proclaimed ; many thousands including women and children were put to death, four sons of the deposed Bar Barua were blinded for having been cognisant of the rising. These atrocities fanned the flames of disaffection. A Mahanta, of the Jakhalabandha Gosain’s family hatched a conspiracy at Jayasagar and was caught and blinded while three of his followers were fried to death in oil. The Morans under Badal Gaonburha rebelled in the extreme east but were dispersed. In 1786 there was a more serious revolt of the Moamarias on the north bank of the Lohit. An expedition against them was cut up; fresh troops sent were also defeated near the Garaimari bil.

Moamariya rebellion
The Chiefs of Rani, Luki and Beltola on being asked, sent up a force to Pahamara in the Majuli.. The Moamarias attacked and took the Goramur Sattra and put the Gauhati levies to flight with heavy loss. The Burha Gohain entrenched at Sonari was attacked and defeated and retreated to Gaurisagar and rejoined the king at Rangpur. The Moamarias advanced, laying waste the country and burning the viilages along their line of march and made their headquarters at Bhatiapar. They failed to take Rangpur. Gaurinath made frantic appeals for help from the Manipuri, Kachari and Jaintia Rajas and the Bar Phukan at Gauhati. The Moamarias by bearing down all resistance: appeared before the gates of Ranpur. The king, panicstriken, fled to Gauhati, accompanied by most of his officers?. The Burha Gohain with the Bar Barua and a few others courageously stayed back to stem the tide of rebellion. The king despatched from Gauhati under the Pani Phukan thirteen thousand men to reinforce the Burha Gohain. Meantime the Moamarias beat the royalists and took possession of Garhgaon, burnt down the palace and destroyed many neighbouring villages, the unprotected common people began to throw in their lot with the rebels.

War with the Moamariyas
 
The Pani Phukan with reinforcements met the Burha Gohain who had retreated as far as the Kaziranga river. The Burha Gohain now assumed the offensive. But a force under the Pani Phukan was cut up in a night attack and a force under the Dhekial Phukan dispersed in confusion mistaking fugitives for Meamarias. The Burha Gohain wanted now to prevent a further advance by the rebels and built a line of forts, along the Namdang river and held them till March, 1788 when a son of Raja Rajeswar Singha, the Pat Konwar with a force joined him. The Moamarias suffering from shortage of supplies having relaxed, the Pat konwar occupied Sibsagar but was soon taken prisoner and put to death by the Moamarias.
In February 1789 the Burha Gohain advanced with success, aided by fresh reinforcements from Gauhati but was driven back to GauriSagar and closely invested there, he had terrible time, provisions running short, troops subsisting on flesh of horses and elephants and many dying of starvation and dysentery!”. The Burha Gohain retreated to Taratali and then to the Desoi where he erected a fort and left it under the command of Japara Gohain who took the opportunity of declaring himself independent but was imprisoned and blinded. In April, 1790 the Burha Gohain constructed a fortified position at Jorhat and vlaced an outpost at Meleng, with the ‘aid of four hundred Bengal mercenaries sent up by Gaurinath, the Burha Gohain made a fort at Teok. On the approach of the rains he again fell back behind the Desoi river!. The Moamarias were repelled with heavy loss in an attack on a fort near the Bar Ali on the right bank of the Desoi and disheart- tened, they now started guerilla tactics, harassing the inhabitants of the tract held by the Burha Gohain by constant night raids and plunder. The people lost heart and would have accepted the Moamaria supremacy but for the untiring efforts of the Burha Gohain who gave them food and clothing and punished them severely for disobedience or disloyalty. The sufferings of the people living in the territory held by the Moamarias were greater—there burning of villages, looting of supplies and wanton destruction of crops, led to a terrible famine, rice was unobtainable, many abandoned their own children ,even the high castes were reduced to eating the flesh of cows, buffaloes, dogs and jackals some wandered in the jungle, subsisting on wild fruits and roots, others fled to the Burha Gohain’s tract or the neighbouring hills or to Bengal.
Numerous petty Raja appeared on the scene on the north bank of the Lohit, at Japaribhita, a weaver set up by the Moamarias, east of Dihing at Bengmara, one Sarbananda, acknowledged by the Morans at Sadiya a Raja and Deka Raja of the Khamtis, and in the Majuli one Howha, exercising authority. The Moamarias placed Bharat Singh on the throne at Rangpur. Bharat Singh and Sarbanand opened mints.

Gaurinath Singha Appeal
Gaurinath appealed for help to the kings of neighbouring States. The Kachari and Jaintia Rajas refused assistance to their once dreaded neighbour, now in difficulties. The Manipuri Raja, grateful for the services rendered him by Rajeswar Singha a few years ago came to Nowgong with five hundred horse and four thousand foot and as desired by Gaurinath, marched to the Burha Gohain’s assistance. The Manipuri Raja moved towards Rangpur, but Moamarias gave battle and put his troops to flight with many killed. The Raja hastened back to Manipur, leaving with the Burha Gohain a thousand men who also de- rested on the approach of the Moamarias. The Burha Gohain still managed to hold his own and in 1792 advanced his line of defence to the Ladaigarh.

Darrang Raja
Gaurinath’s followers exasperated the people of Nowgong by exactions of supplies and oppression and led them to an open revolt under Sindhura Hasarika. The king was attacked and fled, took shelter in the Sattras of the Auniati and Dakhinpat Gossains for some time and then came to Gauhati. Gaurinath had treacherously seized and put to death Hangsa Narayan, the tributary Raja of Darrang on suspicion of sedition and set up in his place Bishnu Narayan, another member of the family ignoring the claims of Krishna Narayan, son of Hangsa Narayan. Krishna Narayan sought the help of the British through Mr. Douglas, the Commissioner of Koch Bihar for reinstatement but went in vain. He then collected a force of Hindustanis and Bengalis, drove Bishnu Naravan and proclaimed himself Raja of Darrang; finding no opposition he proceeded to annex the northern part of Kamrup and even took possession of North Gauhati.

Help from the British
Gaurinath appealed to the collector of Rangpur, Mr. Lumsden for help. A merchant named Mr. Raush, the farmer of the salt revenue at Goalpara also wrote for him. The matter was referred to Lord Cornwallis, the Governor General Lord Cornwallis thought that steps should be taken to restore order, as bands of marauders from British territory had created troubles. Leaders of these gangs were ordered to return, they refused to do so, it was, therefore, decided to expel them by ferce. In September, 1792 six companies of sixty sepoys each were sent to Goalpara under the command of Captain Welsh, with Lieutenant Macgregor as Adjutant and Ensign Wood as Surveyor.

Captain Welsh expedition
Captain Welsh reached Goalpara on 8 November 1792. He obtained detailed information from Mr. Raush and the fugitive Raja, Bishnu Narayan, and being convinced that prompt measures were necessary, decided at once to proceed to the Ahom Raja’s relief. On 16 November, he started up the river towards Gauhati. Three days later, three miles below the Nagarbera hill, a few canoes were sighted, carrying Gaurinath and his attendants. A mob of Doms or fisherman from Pakariguri under a Bairagi had raided and set fire to some houses near the king’s residence, and the king and his advisers, already much unnerved and demoralised, were seized with frantic terror and fled precipitately without the slightest resistance. The advance was continued by Captain Welsh accompanied by Gaurinath and the Bar Barua and also the tributary Chief of Rani who had joined the party at Hatimora, and a point eight miles from Gauhati was reached. Leaving a company in charge of the boats and the Raja, the remaining five companies under Captain Welsh made a night march to Gauhati. Near the gateway, men with torches went out on hearing footsteps but on seeing Sepoys, fled away. The troops crossed the wooden bridge that then spanned the Bharalu river and surprised and overpowered the occupants of the Bairagi’s house. Sixty persons were taken, prisoners. There was no resistance. The Raja thereafter arrived and entered the town in great state. He was given a guard of Sepoys. Negotiations were started with Krishna Narayan and the leaders of his mercenaries or ‘barkandazes’. But the response though respectful was evasive and the mercenaries showed no intention of leaving for home. Krishna Narayan was called up on to come to Gauhati. Gaurinath now finding that he could no longer stand-alone and unaided, sought British assistance against the Moamarias also and placed himself unreservedly in the hands of the British. His petition was referred to the Governor-General and was recommended by Captain Welsh who asked for two more battalions, a couple of six-pounders and a sufficient transport cattle, which could not be procured in Assam in case he was to bring the Moamarias also to submission.Lord Cornwallis highiy commended Captain Welsh for his conduct of the expedition and wished that the Raja should pacity his subjects by conciliatory measures and that Krishna Narayan might be induced to submit by restoration of his ancestral rights.? Captain Welsh was convinced that Krishna Narayan was trifling with him ; so he crossed the Brahmaputra and landed with two hundred and eighty men near a small hi!l with a temple on it, probably Asvakranta, on and around which Krishna Narayan’s troops, three thousand strong, were posted, they could not with- stand the steady discipline and superior arms of the Sepoys and fled with the loss of several killed, wounded and prisoners ; forty cannon mounted on the hill were taken. Krishna Narayan rallied his men and commenced ravaging the tract east of the Bar Nadi (now the Mangaldai Sub-division). Lieutenant Williams was sent; he engaged 500 Barkandazes’at Khatikuchi and worsted them ; a hundred were killed or wounded and the rest fled across the Bhutan frontier, which at this time extended into the plains as far as the Gosain Kamala Ali. Gaurinath did not conciliate his enemies by acts of clemency because of his vindictive nature and also of the evil advice ten- dered by the Bar Barua and other ministers. Since his return to Gauhati 113 persons were murdered including 24 for whose good treatment Welsh himself had given orders. Seventy were in prison dying of starvation. Strong measures were taken by Welsh to stop these atrocities, the Bar Barua and Soladhara Phukan were arrested, the Bar Phukan’s dismissal was demanded, the king was rebuked. The king was not repentant, he accepted responsibility for the brutalities and declared that he would rather abdicate than forgot the power of killing and mutilating his subjects at will. A new Borphukan was appointed. Two manifestoes were issued, one promising righteous administration of justice and redress of grievances after hearing of complaints on appointed days and the other inviting the Chiefs and nobles to come to Gauhati for consultations and for concerting measures for ameliorating the condition of the country. Gsaurinath signed an agreement consenting to the dismissal of the Bar Barua and other officers proved guilty of treachery and oppression, the proclamation of a general amnesty, the abolition of all punishments extending to death or mutilation excent after a regular trial and convocation of all the Chiefs and nobles at Gauhati for framing measures for reestablishing king’s authority and good government of the country. The Bengal mercenaries in Gaurinath’s employ were found oppressing the people and carrying information of Welsh’s movements to the Darrang Raja’s camp and were deported to Rangpur. Krishna Narayan was induced to march into Gauhati with his remaining 400 mercenaries, who were sent off to Rangpur under escort on payment of arrears of pay amounting to six thousand rupees. Krishna Narayan took customary oath of allegiance and was installed as Raja of Darrang. He refunded 6,000 rupees paid to his mercenaries, agreed to pay an annual tribute of fifty eight thousand rupees in lieu of the feudal obligation to supply soldiers and labourers and became a land-holder, really speaking, the political and administrative control vesting in the Bar Phukan. Of fifty eight thousand, three thousand rupees was in lieu of customs duty between Darrang and Bhutan. Krishna Narayan’s mercenaries who had fled to Bhutan, re- appeared but were dispersed easily. The task of restoring confidence and consolidating the Raja’s position proved difficult. ‘The dismissed Bar Barua and Soladhara Phukan were intriguing and causing mischief and were deported to Rangpur. Now the three great Gosains and many officials and feudatory Chiefs signified their adherence to Captain Welsh. Lieutenant MacGregor was sent to Koliabar and supplies were sent up to make Koliabar the base of operations against the Moamarias. The pacification of Nowgong was effected, the Banditti that infected the river and interrupted communications between Gauhati and Goalpara were suppressed. With great difficulty could Gaurinath be persuaded to leave Gauhati, such was his mental torpor and physical lethargy due to excessive consumption of opium. He had doubts whether Welsh with his small force could withstand and overcome the Moamaria host. In 1794 the whole expedition advanced to Koliabar. Here Gaurinath complained of his bad ministers and officers with whom he had neither ability nor inclination to transact business and asked Welsh therefore to concert the necessary measures with them ; Gaurinath also wrote to the Governor General to permit Captain Welsh to use the troops under his command in any man- ner he thought fit to restore order and undertook to pay 3 lakhs of rupees annually for their maintenance, half to be collected by the Bar Phukan from the districts under his control and the other half by the Bar Barua from the rest of the Ahom dominions. In consultation with the Bar Gohain, the Bar Patra Gohain and the Solal Gohain, Captain Welsh appointed the Panisilia Gohain to be Bar Barua, the two princes who had escaped the general sentence of mutilation passed by Gaurinath on the royal family on his accession were made Saring Raja and Tipam Raja res- pectively. A letter was despatched to the Moamaria Chiefs to settle their differences with the Raja. Lieutenant MacGregor went ahead and paid a three days’ visit to Jorhat to interview the Burha Gohain who was still maintaining his unequal struggle against insurgents. After his return to Debargaon, he got an urgent appeal for help from Burhagohain who was being approached by very large numbers of Moamarias. A Subadar and twenty men, out of MacGregor’s total of forty six, were immediately sent to Jorhat ; leaving a naik and eight sepoys to guard the boats and accompanied by Ensign Wood, a havildar and fourteen men, he also followed and reached Jorhat pushing through jungle and avoiding Moamarias. The Moamarias had also advanced quite close to Jorhat and two thousand of them attacked the two officers at the head of the small party of twenty men under the Subedar. The sepoys behaved with great coolness and inflicted such heavy losses that they were soon in full retreat. MacGregor’s loss was only four wounded whereas Moamarias’ about eighty killed and wounded. Captain Welsh got information and set out with his troops from Koliabar via Debargaon. He reached a place about twelve miles from Rangpur and was furiously attacked by a large number of Moamarias armed with matchlocks, spears, and bows; but the assailants were beaten off with heavy loss and their leader him- self was seriously wounded. Captain Welsh who had taken up a strong position on a brick bridge over the Nadang river about five miles from Rangpur, now hastened to Rangpur which had just been evacuated by the enemy who had left behind them in a great hurry large quantities of grain, cattle and treasure. The booty was sold and the sale proceeds, Rs. 1,17,334 were dis-
tributed amongst troops as prize money with Gaurinath’s appro- val. On Gaurinath’s arrival at Rangpur on 21 March 1794 ‘Captain Welsh held a grand Durbar and in the presence of the nobles enquired of the Raja if the help of the British troops could now be dispensed with. The Raja and his ministers were unanimous that if these forces were withdrawn, the country would again relapse into anarchy. Welsh induced the Raja to write to the rebels promising them pardon if they would come in for a peaceful settlement, but there was no response. He despatched three companies to attack the Moamaria headquarters at Bagmara near Rangpur but in the meantime, orders were received from the government prohibiting further offensive operations and so the expedition had to be recalled. Sir John Shore succeeded Lord Cornwallis and non-interference was the keynote of the policy of the new administration. Captain Welsh, a good organiser and a bold and determined leader, displayed consummate tact and singular administrative ability and succeeded admirably in his task. Gaurinath had several times written to Government expressing his appreciation of his services and praying that he might be permitted on for some time longer. Captain Welsh himself reported that
if the detachment were withdrawn, “confusion, devastation and
massacre would ensue.” But all these representations were of
no avail.?° The Moamarias now emboldened by the withdrawal of the
troops sent against them advanced‘and plundered granaries with- in the environs of Rangpur. Welsh determined to disperse them, marched against them and drove them from their encamp- ment ; they retreated but continued guerilla tactics. Welsh with all available troops crossed the Dikhow River and was attacked by a Moamaria force of four thousand men using bows and arrows and guns but their courage oozed away and they broke and fied with heavy loss as Welsh’s troops continued to advance. Despite entreaties from the Raja and petitions from various people, urging him to stay on, Captain Welsh had to leave Rangpur on his return voyage in accordance with the Governor General’s imperative orders, and on 3 July 1794 the exvedition reached British territory.
Gaurinath despairing of holding Rangpur left with his chief nobles for Jorhat which now became the capital. The garrison at Rangpur also fled to Jorhat and Rangpur fell into the hands of the Moamarias. All officers and others who had been favour- ed or protected by Captain Welsh now became the victims of Gaurinath’s vindictive wrath. The Bar Barua was dispossessed and dismissed. The Bar Phukan accused of disloyalty was barbarously murdered ; the Solal Gohain had the same fate, The Bairagi under whom Gauhati had been attacked was beheaded ; all persons of Moamaria persuasion within the king’s tracts were hunted down, robbed and tortured to death and the brutalities were so appalling that many committed suicide to avoid arrest by the persecutors. Captain Welsh’s gloomy forecasts came true quickly. The greatest confusion ensued ; the central Government lost: control over outlying provinces. At Gauhati a Bengali mercenary Hajara Singh usurped power, sold the office of Bar Phukan. In Upper Assam the Purnanada Burhagohain created a standing army modelled on that maintained by the East India Company and recruited from those who served with credit in the Burha Gohain’s operations against the Moamarias. They were given uniform, armed with flint-lock guns purchased in Calcutta, drilled and disciplined by two of Captain Welsh’s native officers who had been heavily bribed to stay on in Assam. Aided by this force, the King’s officers began to be able to deal with the insurgents boldly and firmly and but for the intervention of the Burmese, the downfall of the Ahom dynasty might have been prevented or considerably delayed. Previously flint guns were not in use in Assam. There was a plentiful supply of match-locks. Captain Welsh found twenty thousand match-lock guns at Gauhati but the officials had so neglected their duties that “there were few who knew how to use them. About sixty years previously the Khamtis had descended from the hills to the east and settled on the bank of the Tenga- pani with the permission of the Ahom Raja. In 1794 they took Sadiya, defeated the Raja set up by some Doms of the Moamaria sect and reduced the local Assamese to slavery. The Khamti Chief made himself the Sadiya Khowa Gohain. The Ahoms lost control over Sadiya.

Devastation of the country
Where the Moamarias held sway, whole villages were destroyed, inhabitants were robbed of their possessions, forced to flee the country or subsist on the flesh of unclean animals or wild fruits and roots. Gaurinath in his letter to Sir John Shore said that the Moamarias had destroyed “Cows, Brahmans, Women and Children’ to the extent of one hundred thousand lives. The country between Dergaon and Rangour, once so highly cultivated, was desolate, with many large villages entirely deserted. In lower Assam the Bengal mercenaries and gangs of marauding bandits caused havoc. Where Gaurinath held power, barbarities and persecutions ran rampant against all persons belonging to the Moamaria communion. Captain Welsh’s reports contain a pretence got the Bar Barua, his most powerful rival, arrested and put to death and raised a descendant of Gadadhar Singh, Kinaram, to the throne, saying that he had been nominated by Gaurinath Singh himself interesting information regarding the condition of the country towards the close of the eighteenth century. In December, 1794 Gaurinath Singh died.

Character and legacy
Gaurinath was the most incompetent of all the Ahom Kings. According to Captain Welsh, he was “a poor debilitated man, incapable of transacting business, always either washing or praying, and when seen, intoxicated with opium.” He was vindic- tive and his treatment of the Moamarias and other enemies was cruel. but the stimulus of hatred or revenge was not always needed ; he would frequently perpetrate the grossest barbarities merely for the sadistic pleasure that he found in inflicting sufferings on others. He had a body of executioners ready to carry out his sanguinary orders. One of his servants having inadvertently answered a question meant for another, his eyeballs were extracted and his ears and nose were cut off. Gaurinath neglected his kingly duties and left these to his intriguing and corrupt favourites who, according to Captain Welsh, were “a set of villains, all drawing different ways”. The excesses of the king and his parasites coupled with the physical and moral deterioration of the people were responsible for the ignominious overthrow of his government by the Mayamara rebels. The signal success of Captain Welsh’s small force clearly shows what contemptible foes the Moamarias were. It is un- thinkable that the Ahoms would have been unable to repel the Moamaria rebels, had they presented a united front, undistracted by jealousy and mutual mistrust and unalienated by the excesses of their monarch and of his scheming ministers. The people had hitherto enjoyed a fair measure of happiness and prosperity but during his reign they were plunged into the depths of misery and despair

Administrative work
Gaurinath Singha administrative works were- 
 
Nafuki Rajmao Dol
Aideo Pukhuri
Kuari Pukhuri
 Namti Dol
 Barbarua Pukhuri
 Burhi Gosani Debalay
 Bibudhi Garh
 Aideo Ali

See also 
Ahom dynasty
Moamoria rebellion

Notes

References 

Gogoi, Padmeshwar (1968), The Tai and the Tai Kingdoms
Comprehensive history of Assam, SL Baruah.
1970 Assam in the Ahom Age 1228-1826 by Basu s.

Ahom kings
Ahom kingdom
1795 deaths
Hindu monarchs
18th-century Indian monarchs